The James O. Maxwell Farmstead, located in Haines, Oregon, is listed on the National Register of Historic Places.

See also

 National Register of Historic Places listings in Baker County, Oregon

References

1880 establishments in Oregon
Houses completed in 1880
Houses in Baker County, Oregon
National Register of Historic Places in Baker County, Oregon
Victorian architecture in Oregon
Farms on the National Register of Historic Places in Oregon